City Field is a baseball venue located in the public park of Williams Flowers Park in New Rochelle, New York, United States. It is home to the Iona Gaels baseball team of the NCAA Division I Metro Atlantic Athletic Conference (MAAC). The field's namesake is after William "Brud" Flowers, a New Rochelle resident and athletics coach.

History 
In 2011, the fields were renovated and replaced with synthetic turf. In September, 2012, it was announced that the Iona Gaels baseball team would be moving their home games to City Park.

Features 
The field's features include a synthetic turf playing surface, dugouts, restrooms and lights.

See also 
 List of NCAA Division I baseball venues

References

External links
 City Park, Iona College

Iona Gaels baseball
College baseball venues in the United States
Baseball venues in New York (state)